"She Came In Through the Bathroom Window" is a song by the English rock band the Beatles from their 1969 album Abbey Road. Written by Paul McCartney and credited to Lennon–McCartney, it is the fifth song of the album's climactic B-side medley, immediately following "Polythene Pam".

Origin
McCartney said the song was inspired by one of the fans who hung around outside McCartney's St John's Wood home, and who had broken in, later revealed to be Diane Ashley. She said:

She then opened the front door to let the others inside. In addition to clothes, the fans also stole a number of photographs. 

Margo Bird remembers being good friends with McCartney – she would often take his dog for walks – and later got a job at Apple Corps. She says that she was asked to retrieve a photograph of McCartney's father, Jim, which she did.

Recording
The rhythm track was recorded by the Beatles for this and "Polythene Pam" as one piece on 25 July 1969. After take 39, they added lead vocals, and re-recorded the drums and bass parts. On 28 July they added more vocals, guitar, percussion and piano. The song was completed two days later with additional guitar and percussion. "She Came In Through the Bathroom Window" segues abruptly after "Polythene Pam", the song on the preceding track, without pause.  At the very beginning of the song, in anticipation of the change of tempo, John Lennon gives out a laugh and then shouts "Oh, look out!"

A slower version of this song, recorded in late January 1969 during the Get Back sessions, appears on the 1996 compilation Anthology 3, while an in-progress version is featured on the 2021 Let It Be 50th Anniversary Edition.

Personnel
According to Walter Everett, except where noted:

 Paul McCartney – lead and harmony vocals, bass guitar
 John Lennon – 12-string acoustic guitar, backing vocals
 George Harrison – lead guitar, backing vocals
 Ringo Starr – drums
 uncredited – tambourine, maracas, "whipcrack" percussion

Notable cover versions
 Joe Cocker's cover of this song reached number 30 on the Billboard top 40 in 1970.

Notes

References

External links

 

1969 songs
Songs written by Lennon–McCartney
The Beatles songs
Joe Cocker songs
The Youngbloods songs
Ike & Tina Turner songs
Song recordings produced by George Martin
Songs published by Northern Songs